The Broad Front (FA) is a left-wing political coalition from Uruguay. It was the ruling party of Uruguay from 2005 to 2020 and has produced two presidents: José Mujica (2010–2015) and Tabaré Vázquez (2005–2010; 2015–2020). Since 1999, it has been the largest party in Uruguay's General Assembly.

History
Frente Amplio was founded as a coalition of more than a dozen fractured leftist parties and movements in 1971. The first president of the front and its first candidate for the presidency of the country was General Liber Seregni. The front was declared illegal during the 1973 military coup d'état  and emerged again in 1984 when democracy was restored in Uruguay.

In 1994 Progressive Encounter (Encuentro Progresista) was formed by several minor independent factions and the Frente Amplio. EP and FA started contesting elections jointly under the name Encuentro Progresista - Frente Amplio. Later another force, Nuevo Espacio, became linked to the front. Thus it started contesting elections as Encuentro Progresista - Frente Amplio - Nueva Mayoria.

In 2005 member organizations of Progressive Encounter and New Majority (essentially Nuevo Espacio) merged into the front, and the coalition took the name of the larger force, Frente Amplio. Previously, EP and later NM had been allied with FA but organizationally separate structures.

The alliance is formed by:
Asamblea Uruguay (Uruguay Assembly) led by Danilo Astori
Partido Socialista del Uruguay (Socialist Party of Uruguay) led by Daniel Martínez
Partido Comunista del Uruguay (Communist Party of Uruguay) led by Eduardo Lorier
Corriente 78 (Current 78)
Nuevo Espacio (New Space) led by Rafael Michelini
Vertiente Artiguista (Artiguist Stream) led by Enrique Rubio
Movimiento de Participación Popular (Movement of Popular Participation) led by Lucía Topolansky
Partido Demócrata Cristiano del Uruguay (Christian Democratic Party of Uruguay)
Partido de los Comunes (Party of the Communes)
Confluencia Frenteamplio (Broad Front Confluence)
Alianza Progresista (Progressive Alliance) led by Rodolfo Nin Novoa
Partido por la Victoria del Pueblo (People's Victory Party)

Pre-2004 election: economic crisis 
Starting with the election of Luis Alberto Lacalle of the National Party in 1989, economic reform designed to quickly modernize the country began, which lead to a devaluing of the peso and laws protecting banking secrecy. This secrecy lead to Uruguayan banks becoming a place to launder money from drug and other illegal businesses. By the turn of the century, half the nation had to survive in the informal economy. In 2002, the economic crisis of Brazil and Argentina spread to Uruguay, which crashed as a result of lacking productive power. In August of that year, the nation received 1.5 billion US dollars from the IMF to try and help with the crisis. This was the state of the nation when the Broad Front began campaigning for the 2004 election.

The Broad Front firmly established itself as the country's third major political force at the 1994 elections. Its presidential candidate, Tabaré Vázquez, who replaced longtime leader Seregni as the party's standardbearer, finished with the most votes of any individual candidate. However, under the Ley de Lemas system then in use, Vázquez was denied the presidency because the Broad Front finished with the third-most votes of any party, behind the Colorados and Blancos. At the time, the highest-finishing candidate of the party winning the most votes was elected president. At the same time, the Broad Front surged to 31 seats in the Chamber of Deputies and nine seats in the Senate.

The Ley de Lemas was scrapped for presidential elections in favor of a two-round system for the 1999 elections. Vázquez led the field in the first round, but lost the runoff to the Colorados' Jorge Batlle after the two traditional parties set aside their long rivalry to defeat him. At the same time, the Broad Front became the largest party in the legislature.

2004 election: Tabaré Vazquez and economic reform 
The party's victorious 2004 campaign was the first instance of a left-leaning party gaining the majority in Uruguay. Two of the major reasons the party took power in 2004 was that there was a substantial movement towards more moderate policies and that their support of an increased welfare state created a bond with working-class people tired of the neo-liberalist practices of the end of the twentieth century.

When Tabaré Vázquez first took the position of President with a Broad Front majority in the Uruguayan congress, he quickly moved to strengthen diplomatic relations with other Latin American countries, including Cuba. Important to the future success of the party is the US$100 million anti-poverty program that Vazquez signed early in his career, which helped to ensure the support of the lower class in future elections. Uruguay was in need of economic reform when Vazquez stepped into power in 2005, as it was struggling to recover from the crisis of 2002 with a third of the country still below the poverty line. An important aspect of the economic development was the new Minister of Economics and Finance, Danilo Astori, who worked to create a good relationship with the IMF and obtained the foreign investment, needed to kick start a paper pulp industry. Economic reform was also highlighted by a change in the immigration policy of the US president and increased beef exports to the European Union.

2009 election: Mujica and social liberation 
Since gaining power, the party has maintained the support of the electorate, as analysis of the 2009 election has led to some conclusions that the trust in the stable government played a large part in keeping the Broad Front in power. After the 2009 election, former guerrilla José Mujica became president and during his time in power, a number of leftist social policies were passed. The legalization of abortion, same-sex marriage, and marijuana all occurred under the second consecutive Broad Front majority in the federal government. As noted above, Vazquez vetoed a bill to decriminalize abortion in 2008 but the party as a whole was more supportive of the legalization. Support for legal abortions was universal within the party by 2012, when all party senators voted in favor of a new bill that decriminalized the procedure within the first 12 weeks of pregnancy. In April 2013 same-sex marriage was passed, supported by the party who took a hard-line stance against the role of the church in legislation on the matter. The most recent of major changes under the Mujica presidency is the legalization of marijuana, which was signed in December 2013. A point of consideration for this event is that legalization was not supported by the general population, but the Broad Front still chose to act in favor of it. The economy continued to grow with Astori transitioning from Minister of Economics and Finance to Vice President, a position he used to continue to advertising Uruguay as a safe place for foreign investment.

2014 election: Tabaré Vazquez is re-elected 
The Broad Front has supported the re-election of Tabaré Vazquez in the 2014 election, which Vazquez won with 56,63% at the second turn, defeating National Party's candidate Luis Alberto Lacalle Pou. During its second mandate, Vazquez faced strong criticism from the opposition because of its refusal to cut political ties with Venezuelan president Nicolás Maduro, despite allegations of violations of human rights.

2019 election: Out of government 
The Broad Front supported Daniel Martinez for the 2019 general election. Martinez arrived first at the first turn, but was defeated in the run-off by Luis Alberto Lacalle Pou of the National Party (also endorsed by Colorado Party and Open Cabildo). For the first time in 15 years, the Broad Front was defeated at the polls. The party also lost its majority and in the Chamber of Representatives and the Senate, while remaining the largest party in the General Assembly.

Splits
In its history, despite attracting political factions from other parties over time, the Broad Front has also suffered some splits as well:
In 1989, the Party for the Government of the People and the Christian Democratic Party of Uruguay left the Broad Front to form a new moderate-left coalition.
In 1993, the far-left Oriental Revolutionary Movement split and formed a political party on its own.
In April 2006 there was another split from the far-left: the March 26 Movement and other groups left and formed a new coalition, Popular Assembly (later known as Popular Unity).

Ideology
Broad Front consists primarily of progressive political parties.  It has tended to follow policies favoring a socialist economy with expanded social programs. Not all the parties in the Broad Front can be considered left-wing, indeed some lean towards fiscal conservatism or social conservatism. Uruguay Assembly of Danilo Astori and New Space of Rafael Michelini can be considered a centrist party and Astori has followed fiscal conservative policies as finance minister, whereas the Christian Democratic Party is vocally opposed to abortion.

Results in the 2004 internal elections
In 2004 the first internal elections for EP-FA-NM was held. Previously elections had only been held within FA.

Electoral history

Presidential elections

Chamber of Deputies and Senate elections

See also
Politics of Uruguay

Further reading
Revolution Through Reform: Popular Assemblies, Housing Cooperatives, and Uruguay’s New Left
Una Historia de FUVCAM
FUCVAM: Cooperativismo de vivienda, de los barrios en Montevideo a una alternativa contrahegemónica en otros Sures

References

External links
Official website

 
Political party alliances in Uruguay
Socialist International
Socialist parties in Uruguay
Popular fronts